Episcada is a genus of clearwing (ithomiine) butterflies, named by Frederick DuCane Godman and Osbert Salvin in 1879. They are in the brush-footed butterfly family, Nymphalidae.

Species
Arranged alphabetically:
 Episcada apuleia (Hewitson, 1868)
 Episcada canilla (Hewitson, 1874)
 Episcada carcinia Schaus, 1902
 Episcada clausina (Hewitson, 1876)
 Episcada doto (Hübner, [1806])
 Episcada hemixanthe (C. & R. Felder, 1865)
 Episcada hymen Haensch, 1905
 Episcada hymenaea (Prittwitz, 1865)
 Episcada mira (Hewitson, 1877)
 Episcada philoclea (Hewitson, [1855])
 Episcada polita Weymer, 1899
 Episcada salvinia (Bates, 1864)
 Episcada sulphurea Haensch, 1905
 Episcada sylpha Haensch, 1905
 Episcada ticidella (Hewitson, 1869)
 Episcada vitrea d'Almeida & Mielke, 1967

References

Ithomiini
Nymphalidae of South America
Nymphalidae genera
Taxa named by Osbert Salvin
Taxa named by Frederick DuCane Godman